Taney Place is a historic home located at Adelina, Calvert County, Maryland, United States.  It is a simple, two-story, hip-roofed, Georgian-style country house, dating from about 1750.  It was the birthplace and childhood home of Roger Brooke Taney (1777–1864), who served as Chief Justice of the Supreme Court of the United States from 1836 to 1864.

It was listed on the National Register of Historic Places in 1972.

References

External links
, including undated photo, at Maryland Historical Trust

Houses on the National Register of Historic Places in Maryland
Houses in Calvert County, Maryland
Georgian architecture in Maryland
Houses completed in 1750
Historic American Buildings Survey in Maryland
National Register of Historic Places in Calvert County, Maryland